Bonifatius Becker OSB (31 October 1898 – 9 May 1981) was the first resident abbot in more than 100 years of the Kornelimünster Abbey, a monastery near Aachen that was rebuilt in 1956. He served as abbot between 1956 and 1967.

He was born Josef Becker in Winkels, Westerwald, Hesse-Nassau, Prussia, German Empire, the oldest of 11 children. He became a trained bricklayer, and worked in his parents' building business in Wanne-Eickel, where they had resettled during the great depression.

He joined the Benedictine-Order of Ilbenstadt Abbey in 1930 as a "late calling monk". There he was given his holy orders as a priest in 1937. In May 1939 he was named Prior of the Monastery Kornelimünster, and after he raised the monastery to the status of abbey in 1953, he was named the Apostolic Administrator.

On 9 March 1956 he was elected as abbot of the abbey and on 23 March 1956 received a canonical visitation by Dr. Ildefons Schulte-Strathaus, Abbot of the Abbey of Siegburg, who gave him the signs of his office. On 27 May 1956, he received the blessing of his benediction in the recently rebuilt abbey, a project begun under his supervision, which had been consecrated on 2 May 1956 by the Bishop of Aachen, Johannes Pohlschneider. Bonifatius Becker was abbot until 1967 when he had to retire due to deteriorating health. He died at Kornelimünster in 1981.

References

External links 
 Photos and Newspaper items about Bonifatius Becker from a private German Website
 Original Documents about Bonifatius Becker from a private German Website
 Website of the Abbey Kornelimünster

1898 births
1981 deaths
People from Limburg-Weilburg
People from Hesse-Nassau
German Benedictines
German abbots
Benedictine abbots
Benedictine priors
20th-century German Roman Catholic priests